Zmiyovka or Zmiyevka is the name of several inhabited localities in Russia.

Urban localities
Zmiyovka, Oryol Oblast, an urban-type settlement in Sverdlovsky District of Oryol Oblast

Rural localities
Zmiyevka, Penza Oblast, a settlement in Vysokinsky Selsoviet of Bashmakovsky District of Penza Oblast